CJFW-FM is a Canadian radio station, airing at 103.1 FM in Terrace, British Columbia. It is owned by Bell Media, broadcasting a country format to communities throughout northwestern B.C.

The station began broadcasting in 1983 under Skeena Broadcasters. Around 1987, the corporate name changed to Okanagan Skeena Group Limited. In 1999, Telemedia Radio Inc. purchased Okanagan Skeena Group Ltd. In 2002, Standard Radio Inc. purchased the Western and Ontario operations of Telemedia. Some stations were then sold to other companies but Standard Radio retained the Okanagan Skeena group. On September 27, 2007, Astral Media Radio received CRTC approval to acquire the assets of the radio and television undertakings owned by Standard Radio Ltd., subject to certain conditions. The purchase included CJFW-FM.

On May 28, 2019, as part of a country-wide format reorganization by Bell, CJFW rebranded as Pure Country.

Former logo

Rebroadcasters
CJFW-FM has the following rebroadcasters:

References

External links
Pure Country BC North
 

Jfw
Jfw
Jfw
Jfw
Radio stations established in 1983
1983 establishments in British Columbia